Sterol O-acyltransferase 2, also known as SOAT2, is an enzyme that in humans is encoded by the SOAT2 gene.

Function 

This gene is a member of a small family of Acyl-CoA:cholesterol acyltransferases. The gene encodes a membrane-bound enzyme localized in the endoplasmic reticulum that produces intracellular cholesterol esters from long-chain fatty acyl CoA and cholesterol. The cholesterol esters are then stored as cytoplasmic lipid droplets inside the cell. The enzyme is implicated in cholesterol absorption in the intestine and in the assembly and secretion of apolipoprotein B-containing lipoproteins such as very-low-density lipoprotein (VLDL). Several alternatively spliced transcript variants of this gene have been described, but their full-length nature is not known.

References

Further reading